Terry Palmer may refer to:

 Terry Palmer (footballer) (born 1972), retired Irish soccer player 
 Terry Palmer (alpine skier) (born 1952), American former alpine skier
Terry Palmer (actor) in Bomb in the High Street